Luka Cucin (born 24 November 1998) is a Serbian professional footballer who plays as a defender for Albanian club KF Laçi.

Career
After initially training karate, Cucin started playing football at Srem Jakovo. He later joined the youth system of Partizan. In the summer of 2016, Cucin was loaned to affiliated side Teleoptik. He helped them win the Serbian League Belgrade in the 2016–17 season, as the club earned promotion to the Serbian First League. In early 2018, Cucin was recalled from his loan at Teleoptik and returned to Partizan.

On June 23, 2021, Cucin signed a three-year deal for a Serbian SuperLiga club Vojvodina.

Honours
Teleoptik
 Serbian League Belgrade: 2016–17

Partizan
 Serbian Cup: 2017–18

References

External links
 
 
 
 

1998 births
Living people
Footballers from Belgrade
Association football defenders
FK Partizan players
FK Spartak Subotica players
FK Teleoptik players
FK Vojvodina players
FK Borac Banja Luka players
KF Laçi players
Serbian First League players
Serbian footballers
Serbian SuperLiga players
Serbia youth international footballers